Jennifer Carlisle (born 6 November 1971) is a former association football player who represented New Zealand at international level.

Carlisle made her Football Ferns début in a 1–3 loss to China on 21 November 1997, and finished her international career with five caps and one goal to her credit.

References

1971 births
Living people
New Zealand women's international footballers
New Zealand women's association footballers
Women's association footballers not categorized by position